In enzymology, an alcohol dehydrogenase (acceptor) is an enzyme that catalyzes the chemical reaction

a primary alcohol + acceptor  an aldehyde + reduced acceptor

Thus, the two substrates of this enzyme are primary alcohol and acceptor, whereas its two products are aldehyde and reduced acceptor.

This enzyme belongs to the family of oxidoreductases, specifically those acting on the CH-OH group of donor with other acceptors. The systematic name of this enzyme class is alcohol:acceptor oxidoreductase. Other names in common use include primary alcohol dehydrogenase, MDH, quinohemoprotein alcohol dehydrogenase, quinoprotein alcohol dehydrogenase, quinoprotein ethanol dehydrogenase, and alcohol:(acceptor) oxidoreductase. This enzyme participates in 5 metabolic pathways: glycolysis / gluconeogenesis, 1,2-dichloroethane degradation, propanoate metabolism, butanoate metabolism, and methane metabolism. It employs one cofactor, PQQ.

Structural studies

See also
 Alcohol dehydrogenase

References

 
 
 
 
 

EC 1.1.99
Pyrroloquinoline quinone enzymes
Enzymes of known structure